Sadovy is a rural locality (a selo) and the administrative centre of Bikkulovsky Selsoviet, Miyakinsky District, Bashkortostan, Russia. The population was 569 as of 2010. There are 6 streets.

Geography 
Sadovy is located 26 km north of Kirgiz-Miyaki (the district's administrative centre) by road. Chyatay-Burzyan is the nearest rural locality.

References 

Rural localities in Miyakinsky District